Midway is a town in Hot Spring County, Arkansas, United States. Midway was incorporated on May 3, 2000, and had a population of 389 at the 2010 census.

Geography
Midway is located in south-central Hot Spring County, between the Ouachita River and Interstate 30 and between the towns of Donaldson to the east and Friendship to the west. U.S. Route 67 passes through the southern part of Midway and crosses the Ouachita River at the southeastern border of town.

Demographics

Education
It is divided between the Malvern School District and the Ouachita School District. Malvern High School is the zoned comprehensive high school of the former and Ouachita High School is such of the latter.

References

Towns in Hot Spring County, Arkansas
Towns in Arkansas